Haley Mendez (born 16 August 1993, in New York City) is an American professional squash player. As of February 2018, she was ranked number 46 in the world.

References

1993 births
Living people
American female squash players
20th-century American women
21st-century American women
Competitors at the 2022 World Games